Edward Marsden Waring, MBE (21 February 1910 – 28 October 1986) was a British rugby league football coach, commentator and television presenter.

Early life
Waring was born on 21 February 1910 in Dewsbury in the West Riding of Yorkshire to Arthur Waring, an agent of the Refuge Assurance Company, and Florence Harriet Marsden.

Early career

Waring was never a noted rugby league player; he was more proficient at association football, and had trials with Nottingham Forest and Barnsley. He began work as a typewriter salesman in his home town of Dewsbury, but he gave up that career to join a local newspaper and report on rugby league matches.

Alongside his fledgling journalism career he ran the local Dewsbury Boys Rugby League Club, renaming them the Black Knights (this foreshadowed how Super League clubs were branded some 60 years later). During the Second World War Waring managed Dewsbury RLFC as he was exempted from armed service with an ear condition. Recruiting men from a nearby military camp, he led the club to its second Challenge Cup victory in 1943 – the club's last ever success in the competition.

Returning home via the United States, he met Bob Hope, who alerted him to the success of televised sport. This is believed to have convinced him that television would be crucial for rugby league's long-term success. In the UK, he pushed this case harder with the BBC, having written to them as far back as 1931. After several rejections, he was given a chance as a broadcaster when the BBC began to cover the sport.

Broadcasting style
Waring's commentary polarised opinion over the next decades. For some viewers he would be "Uncle Eddie," the warm and friendly voice of the north, but others believed that his voice simply reinforced stereotypes. During the 1960s, his eccentric mode of speech (Hull Kingston Rovers was pronounced "Hulking Stan Rovers") and his northern accent began to be widely impersonated, largely by Mike Yarwood.

In the badly rain-affected 1968 Challenge Cup Final at Wembley, Waring described Wakefield Trinity player Don Fox with the line "He's a poor lad!" after Fox missed a last minute kick from in front of the posts against Leeds. The miss handed the cup to his opponents. His commentary on the game was widely praised; The Guardian said in 2007 that the game was "seared into the public consciousness" in part because of it.

Many of his lines became catchphrases in the game, including, "It's an up and under" (a rugby tactic consisting of kicking the ball in a high arc, while the rest of the team rushes toward the landing point, hoping to gain possession and field position) and "He's goin' for an early bath" (when a player was sent off the field for a serious foul).

Celebrity appearances 
Waring branched out, appearing first as the referee on the television series It's a Knockout, and as the UK's representative on the international umpiring team for the European version of the show, Jeux Sans Frontieres. When Arthur Ellis became the GB referee, Waring became the co-host of It's A Knockout alongside David Vine and later Stuart Hall, compering the 'Marathon' round, and commentating with those colleagues for the international version (where he handled the 'Fil Rouge') and co-hosting the annual international GB heat. From the 1979 series of Jeux Sans Frontieres, Stuart Hall was the lone commentator, but Waring still co-hosted the GB heat in each series until 1981. Unwell, he struggled badly in the 1981 edition and seemed lost for words throughout. He was replaced by Brian Cant for the 1982 GB heat, the last series in which GB participated.

He also made guest appearances in the TV comedy programmes The Morecambe and Wise Show and The Goodies.

Decline and retirement 
The split in opinion regarding his contribution to the game, plus illness, led to a decline in Waring's popularity. A petition was organised by some hardcore supporters asking the BBC to remove him from commentary as he was perceived to be portraying a poor image of the game and its northern roots. The BBC stuck with him as their main commentator, though in the late 1970s they also brought in former Great Britain halfback Alex Murphy to work alongside him.

Illness affected him over the next few years, and he commentated on his last Challenge Cup Final in 1981. After his retirement, former dual rugby international Ray French became the BBC's chief rugby league commentator.

Death 
Waring's overall health declined very quickly after his retirement from the commentary box. He was diagnosed with dementia and died at High Royds Hospital in Menston, West Yorkshire in 1986.

Notes

References 

 The Times – Sport section 2 March 2006
 Paul Fox: Waring, Edward Marsden [Eddie] Oxford Dictionary of National Biography, Oxford University Press, 2004; accessed 17 February 2008
 In search of Eddie Waring: the voice of rugby league who divided its fans The Yorkshire Post, 6 September 2010

Bibliography 
 Eddie Waring on Rugby League by Eddie Waring
 Rugby League: The Great Ones by Eddie Waring

Further reading

External links 
 
 Eddie Waring – the ups and unders BBC Inside Out Yorkshire & Lincolnshire, 7 March 2005
 Discovering the real Eddie Waring The Independent, 5 February 2008
 Biographies: Eddie Waring JFSnetUK

1910 births
1986 deaths
BBC sports presenters and reporters
Dewsbury Rams coaches
English rugby league coaches
English rugby league commentators
English sports broadcasters
English television presenters
Members of the Order of the British Empire
Sportspeople from Dewsbury
Deaths from dementia in England